Saint Oliver Plunkett's GAC Greenlough is a Gaelic Athletic Association club based in Clady/Greenlough, County Londonderry, Northern Ireland. The club is a member of Derry GAA and currently caters for Gaelic football and camogie, and also competes in Scór. The club is named after Irish martyr Saint Oliver Plunkett.

Greenlough has won the Derry Intermediate Football Championship three times and the Derry Junior Football Championship three times.

2019 Championship Football

2018 Championship Football

2017 Championship Football

Gaelic football
Greenlough fields Gaelic football teams at U8, U10, U12, U14, U16, Minor, Reserve and Senior levels. They currently compete in the Derry Senior Championship and Division 1 of the Derry ACFL. Their current manager is Niall Conway.

Camogie
Greenlough also fields camogie teams at various age-groups. The camogie teams compete as St Columba's Camogie Club, although they use the Greenlough grounds.

History
St Oliver Plunkett's GAC Greenlough was founded in 1939 by Michael Henry, Patrick Rankin and Louis Madden.  Despite a lack of silverware during the period, the 1940s saw arguably the greatest ever Greenlough team. Players such as Thomas Edward McCloskey, Jimmy Cassidy and the McErlean brothers (Eoin and Henry) played on the Derry Senior side of the time. Jimmy Cassidy in November 2007 was voted as the Right-Corner Forward for the All Time Star Derry team. The club's first major success at Senior level came in 1953 when they won the Derry Junior Football Championship and added a second Junior Championship in 1965. In Scór Greenlough has won two All Ireland titles; in Senior Céilí dancing and in Junior Ballad groups.

The club won the Derry Intermediate Football Championship for the first time in 1976. The new park and pavilion were opened in the GAA's centenary year (1984) and are dedicated to Saint Oliver Plunkett. The Derry Senior Football Championship final that year between Dungiven and Castledawson was held at the venue. Two years later, Greenlough won the Derry Junior Championship for a third time.

On Easter Sunday 2002 Greenlough reopened their pavilion which was damaged in an arson attack two years previously. The opening took place after the final of the Ulster U-21 Football Championship final which was hosted by Greenlough. The club won the 2005 Derry Senior Football League Second division and hence were promoted to the First Division and the Derry Senior Championship, however the club were relegated in the following season.

In May 2014, the club celebrated its 75th anniversary with a gala dinner and other commemorative events.

Football titles

Senior
Derry Intermediate Football Championship: 3
1976, 2008, 2015
Derry Intermediate Football League: 1
2005, 2015
Derry Junior Football Championship: 3
 1953, 1965, 1986

Minor
Tommy O'Neill Cup (Derry Minor 'B' Football Championship) 1
1999
South Derry Minor 'B' Football Championship: 4
1994, 1998, 1999, 2005
South Derry Minor 'B' Football League: 1
2005

Under-14
Derry Féile na nÓg
Runners up 2019

Note: The above lists may be incomplete. Please add any other honours you know of.

Notable players
 Brian McCallion (c)
 Enda Lynn (Current Derry footballer)
 Niall Loughlin

See also
Derry Intermediate Football Championship
List of Gaelic games clubs in Derry

External links
St Oliver Plunkett's GAC Website

References

Gaelic games clubs in County Londonderry
Gaelic football clubs in County Londonderry